James Walsh (3 December 1930 – 6 August 2014) was a professional footballer who played for Celtic and Leicester City as a forward. He was a prolific goalscorer and scored the winning goals in both the finals of the 1951 Saint Mungo Cup and the 1953 Coronation Cup, as well as playing in the 1955 Scottish Cup Final for Celtic. He then moved to Leicester City in 1956, where he was twice the club's top scorer in 1958-59 and 1960–61. He also played as Leicester lost the 1961 FA Cup Final. He still remains as one of Leicester's top 10 all-time top goalscorers.

Walsh died on 6 August 2014 at the age of 83.

Honours 
Celtic
 Scottish League Champion: 1953-54
 Scottish Cup Runner-up: 1955
 Scottish League Cup Winner: 1956
 Coronation Cup Winner: 1953
 Saint Mungo Cup Winner: 1951

Leicester City
 FA Cup Runners-up: 1961

References

External links 
 

1930 births
2014 deaths
Footballers from Glasgow
Association football inside forwards
Scottish footballers
Celtic F.C. players
Leicester City F.C. players
Rugby Town F.C. (1945) players
Scottish Football League players
English Football League players
Scotland under-23 international footballers
FA Cup Final players